Alan Squire (9 February 1927 – 12 June 2003) was an Australian rules footballer who played with St Kilda in the Victorian Football League (VFL).

Squire played 108 games for St Kilda, between 1948 and 1954, as a defender and in the ruck.

He represented Victoria in 1951 and after leaving St Kilda coached Boronia.

References

1927 births
Australian rules footballers from Victoria (Australia)
St Kilda Football Club players
Melbourne High School Old Boys Football Club players
2003 deaths